Morningside Cemetery is a cemetery in south Edinburgh. It was established in 1878 by the Metropolitan Cemetery Company, originally just outwith the then city boundary, the nearest suburb then being Morningside. It extends to just over 13 acres in area. The cemetery contains 80 war graves. Although arguably visually uninspiring the cemetery contains the graves of several important female figures; including a female air commandant, Scotland's first female surgeon, the first female Fellow of the Royal College of Physicians of Edinburgh, a Nobel Prize winner and many church missionaries.

History
The cemetery was soon enveloped by the city and now lies between Balcarres Street (to its north) and Morningside Drive (to its south). Its original entrance was very grand. This was off Belhaven Terrace to the east. However, although the entrance gates and railings still exist, this route is now blocked, a modern housing development, Belhaven Place, standing over the graveyard, in defiance of cemetery legislation. This is not the sole loss of ground: Balcarres Court has been built to the north-west; Morningside Court to the south-west; and numerous blocks have been added along most of Morningside Drive. This leaves the cemetery detached from its surroundings, hard to access, and seriously compromised in terms of its design integrity.

The developments, essentially asset-stripping in relation to the original Cemetery Company, represent a period of private ownership between the original Cemetery Company ownership and compulsory purchase by the City of Edinburgh Council in February 1992.

Layout
The overall layout is broadly rectilinear but with a slight curve on its east–west axis. There is a general drop in ground levels from south to north giving an overall form of a shallow amphitheatre.

Apart from a central avenue of trees on the main east–west path the landscape is undramatic and unstructured, and lacks the atmosphere of its predecessors, such as Dean Cemetery.

The overall distribution of stones is spartan, especially towards the north. Larger monuments tend to lie to the south-west. One section lies almost detached, to the south-east, accessed through a pathway between the modern housing developments, isolated as an ignoble peninsula. The local Morningside Library has an index which can be used to locate specific stones.

Current operation

Morningside is one of the few city cemeteries to be open 24 hours per day. This has both advantages and disadvantages; exposing it to vandalism during unsocial hours. Vandalism levels worsened in 2020.

The cemetery remains open to burials and interment of ashes. Style of monument is not controlled.

War graves
The cemetery is an official Commonwealth War Grave Cemetery containing 48 memorials from World War I and 32 from World War II. The dead largely represent those dying of wounds following repatriation, linking to the nearby City Hospital. The Cross of Remembrance stands in the north-east section of the cemetery.

Unusually two war graves are of female victims (both from the ATS): Margaret White Walker (1922-1945) and Jean Dewar Scougall (1921-1943).

Notable interments
Mary Aitken (died 1918) member of Women's Royal Air Force in First World War. Possibly the only war grave with this rare link
Prof Rev William Menzies Alexander (1858–1929), academic, theologian, Moderator of the Free Church of Scotland 1911/12
Alexander John ("Jack") Travers Allan (1879-1898), golfer
Sir Edward Victor Appleton (1892–1965), physicist, winner of the 1947 Nobel Prize for Physics
Isabella Bartholomew Mears LRCPE (1854-1936) early female doctor, mother of Frank Mears
Stanley Booth-Clibborn (1924-1996) Bishop of Manchester
John Breingan (1857-1930), architect
William Gordon Brown (1895-1916), mathematician killed in the First World War (memorial only)
Alexander Low Bruce (1839–1893) entrepreneur
Dr Grace Ross Cadell (1855-1918) and Martha Georgina Isabella Cadell (1858-1905) suffragette sisters who were two of Britain's first female doctors
Rev Henry Calderwood (1830–1897) minister and academic
Air Commandant Dame Helen Cargill (1896-1969) (stone fallen)
Ralph Copeland (1837–1905) astronomer
Alison Cunningham (1822-1913) Robert Louis Stevenson's nanny, referred to as "Cummy" in his books
Prof Alexander Darroch (1862-1924) educationalist
Dr John Michael Dewar FRSE (1883-1941) gynaecologist and ornithologist
Alexander Scott Dodd FRSE (1885-1964) Edinburgh city analyst
Campbell Douglas (1828–1910), architect
Thomas Noble Foulis (1878-1943) publisher (stone fallen)
James Geikie FRS (1839–1915), geologist
George Whitton Johnstone RSA RSW (1849–1901) artist
Dr Claude Buchanan Ker (1867-1925) physician and medical author
The Very Rev Prof Daniel Lamont (1870–1950), Moderator of the Church of Scotland 1936/7
Jessie Lennox (1830-1933) oldest occupant of the cemetery, and friend of Florence Nightingale and David Livingstone
Prof George Lichtenstein (1827–1893) Hungarian-born musician
Lonsdale McAll (1870-1937) medical missionary at Yale-in-China
Hannah MacGoun RSW (1864-1913) artist
Sir Atholl MacGregor (1883-1945) law lord
Prof James Gordon MacGregor FRS FRSE (1851-1913) physicist
Prof W. J. M. Mackenzie (1909-1996)
Prof Hugh Mackintosh (1870–1936) theologian
John McLachan (1843–1893), architect
Rev Prof Hugh Baillie MacLean (1910-1959) controversial minister
Thomas Forbes MacLennan (1873-1957) architect
Lord William Reginald MacLeod of the Highland Light Infantry (d.1904) plaque by William Grant Stevenson
John MacRae (1836-1893) civil engineer who worked on the early stages of the Suez Canal
Very Rev Alexander Mair (1834-1911) final Moderator of the United Presbyterian Church of Scotland and his son Prof Alexander William Mair (1875-1928) scholar of Greek and academic author
Thomas P. Marwick (1854–1927), architect
Dr Robert Charles Menzies FRSE (1887-1972) chemist
John Douglas Michie (1830-1895), artist (stone fallen)
Margret Isabel Mitchell (1920-2016) pioneer nurse educator in Africa and Middle East for the World Health Organisation
Harriet E. Moore (d.1919) monument by her grandson Pilkington Jackson
Robert Morham (1839-1912) city architect
Very Rev Pearson McAdam Muir DD (1846-1924) of Glasgow Cathedral, Moderator of the General Assembly of the Church of Scotland 1910
Captain Granville Toup Nicolas RN (1832-1894) son of Admiral John Toup Nicolas
William Thomas Oldrieve HRSA FRIBA (1853-1922) architect (stone fallen)
Prof Hugh Bryan Nisbet FRSE (1902-1969) First Principal of Heriot-Watt University (stone fallen)
Ben Peach FRS FRSE (1842-1926) geologist (stone inaccessible)
George Pearson (1876-1928) astronomer, Fellow of the Royal Astronomical Society (stone fallen)
Dr Isabella Pringle (1876-1963) first female Fellow of the Royal College of Physicians of Edinburgh
Andrew Seth Pringle-Pattison (1856–1931), philosopher
David Robertson (architect) (1834-1925) (stone fallen)
James Logie Robertson (1846–1922) poet (under the pen-name of Hugh Haliburton)
J. H. Ronaldson (1858-1935) geologist and mining engineer
James Kirkwood Slater FRSE OBE (1900-1975) physician
Gourlay Steell RSA (1819–1894) artist (stone fallen)
Harold Thomas Swan (1922-2011) haematologist
Dr Johnson Symington FRS FRSE FZS (1851-1924) anatomist
George Hunter MacThomas Thoms FRSE (1831-1903) Sheriff of Orkney and Shetland, funder of the restoration of St Giles Cathedral
Andrew Tod (1819-1898) sculpted by D.A.Tod
Andrew Wilson (zoologist) FRSE (1852-1912) zoologist and author (stone fallen)
Very Rev James Hood Wilson DD (1829-1903) Moderator of the General Assembly of the Free Church of Scotland 1895
John Wilson (1844-1909) founder of the Edinburgh Evening News
Alexander Waugh Young (1836-1915) classical scholar and author

Notes

External links
http://www.edinburgh.gov.uk/directory_record/18717/morningside_cemetery

https://www.morningside.org.uk/friends-of-morningside-cemetery/

1878 establishments in Scotland
Cemeteries in Edinburgh
Commonwealth War Graves Commission cemeteries in Scotland